Adéọlá Ọlágúnjú is a Nigerian visual artist working with photography, video, sound and installations.

Early life and education

Adéọlá Ọlágúnjú grew up in Nigeria during the era of military dictatorship  a tumultuous period that influenced her future work by teaching her, in her own words, that "rebirth comes with chaos, confusion, and destruction". Adéọlá Ọlágúnjú attended the Ladoke Akintola University of Technology in Ogbomosho, Nigeria, where she graduated in 2009 with a bachelor's degree in Fine and Applied Arts. In 2021, she earned a master's degree in Photography Studies and Practice at the Folkwang University of the Arts in Essen, Germany.

Exhibitions 
Ọlágúnjú's work has been exhibited at galleries and museums including Palais des Beaux-Arts de Bruxelles, Bonhams in London, Rencontres d'Arles,  Lagos Biennial, Arti et Amicitiae, Amsterdam Palais de Tokyo Paris, African Photography Encounters, Musée d'Art Moderne de Paris, and Galerie In Situ, Paris.

Publications with contributions by Ọlágúnjú 
Africa Under the Prism: Contemporary African Photography from LagosPhoto Festival. Hatje Cantz, 2015. With texts by Chimamanda Adichie.
The Art of Nigerian Women. Ben Bosah, 2017. .
A Stranger's Pose. Cassava Republic, 2018. By Emmanuel Iduma. .
The Journey: New Positions in African Photography. Kerber , 2020. Edited by Simon Njami and Sean O'Toole. .

Awards 
 2012:  Lagos Photo Festival Award 
 2019:  Seydou Keïta Grand Prize Award "Best photographic creation" at the Bamako Encounters International Biennial for Photography

See also 
 List of Nigerian women artists

References 	

Nigerian women artists
Nigerian contemporary artists
Nigerian artists
Nigerian women photographers
Nigerian video artists
Nigerian photographers
21st-century women artists
Year of birth missing (living people)
Living people